Jon Richardson (born 1982) is an English comedian.

Jon Richardson may also refer to:
Jon Richardson (footballer) (born 1975), English footballer

See also
John Richardson (disambiguation)
Jonathan Richardson (disambiguation)